The 1968–69 Challenge Cup was the 68th staging of rugby league's oldest knockout competition, the Challenge Cup.

The final was contested by Castleford and Salford at Wembley in front of a crowd of 97,939. Castleford won the match 11–6.

The winner of the Lance Todd Trophy was Castleford  Mal Reilly.

First round

Second round

Quarter-finals

Semi-finals

Final

Notes

References

External links
 
 Challenge Cup official website 
 Challenge Cup 1968/69 results at Rugby League Project

Challenge Cup
Challenge Cup